Luciana Lagorara (born 25 November 1936) is a retired Italian gymnast. Together with her younger sister Elena she competed in all artistic gymnastics events at the 1956 Summer Olympics with the best individual result of 39th place on the vault.

References

1936 births
Living people
Gymnasts at the 1956 Summer Olympics
Olympic gymnasts of Italy
Italian female artistic gymnasts